Ebrahim Kandi may refer to:
Ebrahim Kandi, Germi
Ebrahim Kandi, Meshgin Shahr
Ebrahim Kandi-ye Olya, Parsabad County
Ebrahim Kandi-ye Sofla, Parsabad County
Ebrahim Kandi-ye Vosta, Parsabad County